The 2011 Dalbandin earthquake occurred on  with a moment magnitude of  7.2 and a maximum Mercalli intensity of VII (Very strong). The shock occurred in a sparsely populated area of Balochistan, caused moderate damage, three deaths, and some injuries.

Earthquake
The tectonic environment of this region is dominated by the motions of the Arabian Plate, the Indian Plate, and the Eurasian Plate. This earthquake occurred as a result of normal faulting within the lithosphere of the subducted Arabian Plate.

Damage
About 200 mud houses, including some government offices were reported damaged in the Dalbandin area of Pakistan. Two women died of heart attacks in Quetta after the earthquake, about 330 km northeast of the epicenter, where the Mercalli intensity was IV (Light).

Intensity
Tremors after the earthquake reached neighboring countries including Bahrain, UAE, Oman, Iran, Afghanistan, and India. It was felt with a Mercali intensity of IV (Light) in Islamabad, Karachi, Muscat, Delhi, and III (Weak) in Kabul, Dubai, and Abu Dhabi.

See also 
Chaman Fault
List of earthquakes in 2011
List of earthquakes in Pakistan

References

Further reading

External links
Major earthquake strikes southwestern Pakistan – CNN
Dalbandin, Pakistan Earthquake of 18 January 2011, Mw 7.2 – IIEES
Pakistan: Post-Earthquake Assessment for Town of Dalbandin, Balochistan (28 Jan 2011) – ReliefWeb

2011 earthquakes
2011 in Pakistan
Earthquakes in Pakistan
History of Balochistan, Pakistan (1947–present)
Government of Yousaf Raza Gillani
January 2011 events in Pakistan